Şirvanlı (also, Shirvanly) is a village and municipality in the Oghuz Rayon of Azerbaijan.  It has a population of 824.

References 

Populated places in Oghuz District